Sergey Mikayelyan (born April 27, 1992) is an Armenian cross-country skier who has competed since 2008. He finished 70th in the 15 km event at the 2010 Winter Olympics in Vancouver.

At the FIS Nordic World Ski Championships 2009 in Liberec, Mikayelyan finished 105th in the individual sprint while getting lapped in the 30 km mixed pursuit event.

He has four victories in lesser events since 2009.

References

1992 births
Armenian male cross-country skiers
Cross-country skiers at the 2010 Winter Olympics
Cross-country skiers at the 2014 Winter Olympics
Living people
Olympic cross-country skiers of Armenia
Universiade medalists in cross-country skiing
Russian people of Armenian descent
Universiade bronze medalists for Armenia
Competitors at the 2017 Winter Universiade